Barrow Gurney Nunnery (also called Minchin Barrow) was established around 1200 in Barrow Gurney Somerset, England.

The Benedictine nunnery was founded by one of the Fitz-Hardinges (or Fitzhardinge), and in 1212, was left 10 marks in the will of Hugh de Wells. The nunnery also received a pension on the church of Twerton by the time of the Taxatio in 1291. Several other donations of money and land had been received by the Valor of 1535 when the property was assessed as worth £29 6s. 8½d. on which there were charges of £5 12s. 4¾d., leaving a clear value of £23 14s. 3¾d.

The nunnery was still poor and by 1398 had transferred from the Diocese of Wells to the Diocese of Llandaff.

At the dissolution of the monasteries in 1536 its value was £31. The area and buildings were granted by Henry VIII to John Drew, of Bristol, who converted it into a private mansion, renamed Barrow Court.

References

Monasteries in Somerset
1200 establishments in England
1536 disestablishments in England
Benedictine nunneries in England